Nomenclature of Organic Chemistry, commonly referred to by chemists as the Blue Book, is a collection of recommendations on organic chemical nomenclature published at irregular intervals by the International Union of Pure and Applied Chemistry (IUPAC). A full edition was published in 1979, an abridged and updated version of which was published in 1993 as A Guide to IUPAC Nomenclature of Organic Compounds. Both of these are now out-of-print in their paper versions, but are available free of charge in electronic versions. After the release of a draft version for public comment in 2004 and the publication of several revised sections in the journal Pure and Applied Chemistry, a fully revised version was published in print in 2013.

See also 
Nomenclature of Inorganic Chemistry (the Red Book)
Quantities, Units and Symbols in Physical Chemistry (the Green Book)
Compendium of Chemical Terminology (the Gold Book)
Compendium of Analytical Nomenclature (the Orange Book)

References

External links 
http://library.lol/main/39EDE24F46553A23EF1A46F0B0B0315E
Searchable Internet version of the 1979 and 1993 recommendations
2004 draft recommendations (the proposed new version of the Blue Book)
IUPAC Nomenclature Books Series (commonly known as the "Colour Books")
Bibliography of translations
Official corrigendum to the 1993 recommendations

Chemical nomenclature
Chemistry reference works
1979 non-fiction books
1993 non-fiction books
2013 non-fiction books